Arnaud Gouillon (born 27 November 1985) is a French humanitarian worker and the founder of Solidarité Kosovo, a French non-governmental humanitarian organization devoted to helping Serbs living in enclaves in Kosovo. He serves as the acting director of the Office for cooperation with the diaspora and the Serbs in the region in the Ministry of Foreign Affairs of Serbia since 26 November 2020. 

He is author of the book "All My Roads lead to Serbia" (in Serbian: "Svi moji putevi vode ka Srbiji").

He was awarded with the highest State and church decorations of Serbia for the fifteen years of his humanitarian work.

In 2012 he settled in Belgrade with his family. He is active in several cultural associations and regularly holds lectures and panels around Serbia and abroad.

In 2015, he received the Serbian citizenship based on his merits in the field of humanitarian work and the passport of the Republic of Serbia was delivered to him at an official ceremony in the Palace of Serbia by the Minister of the Interior of the Republic of Serbia, Nebojša Stefanović.

Biography

Youth 
He was born on 27 November 1985. in Grenoble (France). As the youngest of three children, he grew up in a harmonious family in which traditions, patriotism and historical friendship between France and Serbia were nurtured. Influenced by these family values, his view of events in the former Yugoslavia is significantly different from the prevailing views in the West.

During the  bombing of Serbia in 1999. As a 13-year-old schoolboy, he entered into a debate with a history professor, a conspirator of war, and advocated for peace and justice for the Serbian people.

When in 2004. Anti-Serb pogroms broke out throughout Kosovo and Metohia, he decided to take concrete action and provide assistance to families, innocent victims of persecution. At the age of nineteen, he founded the humanitarian organization "Solidarity for Kosovo" with the aim of helping the Serbian people and other national minorities living in enclaves in Kosovo and Metohia.

Education 
He completed his elementary education in his hometown of Jarrie and his secondary education in Vizille. In 2002, he enrolled in the Faculty of Physics with an optional Master of Mathematics at the University of Grenoble, the second best university in France and 32nd in the world in Physics according to the Shanghai List. In 2004, he passed the examination for admission to the distinguished Engineering Polytechnic School of the University of Grenoble, majoring in Ecology and Risk Prevention, while in 2007 He obtained the master's degree with the title of engineer at the age of 22, in the field of "environmental protection". In 2012 he attended a Master of Political Science at the Faculty of Political Sciences in Belgrade, majoring in "Political System of Serbia and Institutions".

In addition to his native language French, he speaks Serbian, English and Russian.

Carriere 

Between 2007 and 2010 he worked as an engineer at L'Oréal in Paris, at the Chamber of Commerce in Bordeaux, as a professor of physics at a French school in Cairo and as a quality coordinator in Zvornik (Republika Srpska) for Studen-Prom, a company exporting frozen food products to France.

Since 2011, he has been employed as the director of the charity NGO Solidarity for Kosovo, which he founded when he was a student and where he was volunteering during seven years.

By the decision of the Government of the Republic of Serbia, since 2020, the acting Director of the Office for Cooperation with the Diaspora and Serbs in the region.

Humanitarian work 
He is a regular interlocutor of the French media who want to write about the humanitarian situation in Kosovo and Metohija.
He organized a 52-minute documentary about the life of the Serbian people in Kosovo and Metohija, aired four times on French television channel KTO and twice on the Serbian National Television channel RTS. The film entitled "Kosovo, Christianity at Risk" was awarded as the best performance at the Zaječar Documentary Spiritual Film Festival and at the 2018 International Orthodox Film Festival in Kruševac.

Solidarity for Kosovo 

His humanitarian work began with the creation in 2004 of the charity NGO Solidarity for Kosovo, which was founded in response to the anti-Serb unrest that afflicted Kosovo and Metohija on March 17 and 18, 2004. He came to Serbia for the first time in 2005 with his brother Bertrand and two friends bringing the humanitarian aid gathered in France. Gouillon's brothers’ small student organization quickly grew into one of the largest charities operating in the Balkans.

With the support of over 12,000 donors from all over France, and without any State or European sponsorship, Solidarity for Kosovo has organized over 44 humanitarian aid vehicles and funded dozens of projects in the areas of education, health and agriculture in cooperation with the Diocese of Raška-Prizren. The organization is recognized in the field for its self-sustaining projects that allow people to live from their work rather than from humanitarian aid. In cooperation with the Soup Kitchen "Majka Devet Jugovića", it funded the construction of five farms, one dairy, one plant for the pasteurization of fruits and vegetables, it built dozens of greenhouses and purchased hundreds of animals such as cows, sheep and goats, as well as agricultural machines for the local Serbian enclaves.

Working with children and humanitarian projects for children are also one of the priorities of the NGO Solidarity for Kosovo. From 2012 to date, it has renovated 34 schools, took hundreds of children for the first time to the seaside, and helped operate two maternity wards, one hospital and four health centers.

The total worth of the assistance provided by Solidarity for Kosovo to socially disadvantaged families living in the Serbian enclaves in Kosovo and Metohija exceeds €5.5 million.

Social and cultural involvement 

In addition to his humanitarian work, Arnaud Gouillon is very active in the social and cultural areas. In 2016, Arnaud Gouillon was invited to be one of the participants in the campaign "Let's cherish the Serbian language", sponsored by the Ministry of Culture of the Republic of Serbia, with the aim of cultivating and protecting the Serbian language, alphabet, general linguistic culture and literacy. Two years later, he became the trademark and the leader of the Speech Culture Caravan, which organizes trainings and panels for young people across Serbia and Republika Srpska.

He also often responds to calls from other cultural or humanitarian associations, such as Telethon in Belgrade, Dani Jorgovana in Kraljevo, Ljubičevski Equestrian Games in Požarevac, etc...

He is a frequent guest of the different Institutes of Culture, Universities and Secondary Schools from Serbia and Republika Srpska, that invite him to talk about his experience in the field of humanitarian work and social involvement, but also on philosophical topics such as the symbol of life, humanism, justice. From 2012 to the present, he has delivered over one hundred lectures and panels in the Serbian language.

Aware that in addition to the Kosovo issue, one of the biggest challenges for Serbia is the departure of young people abroad, Arnaud Gouillon founded the INOMS Association in Belgrade in 2016 (Initiative for Birthrate and Staying of the Young People in Serbia – in Serbian: Inicijativa za Natalitet i Ostanak Mladih u Srbiji). The aim of this association is to encourage young people to stay in Serbia through positive and successful examples from Serbia, as well as with the demystification of an idealized life abroad.

Political involvement 

Arnaud Gouillon became politically aware at the age of 13 when he publicly defended his political stance for the first time in history class, days after the bombing of the Serbian National Television building on 23 April 1999. His history professor at the time justified the crime by saying that "the Serbian Television has become a military target as it broadcasts propaganda", to which the young Arnaud Gouillon replied that "a media house, no matter how it works, must not become a military target and by killing civilians and innocent people, we do not do humanitarian work. The French media also spreads propaganda, but no one bombs them for that." Afterwards, the professor wanted to expel him from the class.

As a teenager, Arnaud Gouillon expressed his revolt against the system by participating in political rallies of several patriotic associations and actively fighting for the preservation of traditional French values and against the military interventionism of the West in the Middle East and Africa.

When he was only 24 years old, in 2010, the ambitious young Arnaud Gouillon tried to get 500 signatures from mayors so he could run in the French presidential election two years later. In this challenge, he received the support of several movements, including the Bloc Identitaire movement, of which the young Arnaud Gouillon was a member, known for its commitment to a strong Europe and opposition to the illegal arrival of migrants in France. Following this experience, which ended in 2011, he left his political activities and devoted himself fully to his humanitarian and socially useful work.

Since 26 November 2020, Gujon is serving as the acting director of the Office for Cooperation with the Diaspora and the Serbs in the Region in the Ministry of Foreign Affairs of Serbia.

Publications

In Serbia 
He published the book, "All My Roads Lead to Serbia," explaining the reasons that led him to defend the Serbs in Kosovo and Metohija and then connect his fate with the fate of the Serbian people by moving to Belgrade. The author also describes Serbia the way a foreigner sees it and points out that Serbia is "at the beginning of a significant phase in its history, at the beginning of a new historical journey. The challenges are serious, but it will resist them. There is a lot to build, a lot to be preserved. From this alchemical process a modern Serbia will emerge, based on its traditional foundations. Because Serbia, like all the old countries, is the roots without which nothing would make sense, but it is also the wings with which Serbia will fly and overcome what exists now."

In France 
He participated in writing and publishing of three books in French on Serbia and Kosovo and Metohija:

 2013. Au cœur de l'Europe Martyre (Édition L'Age d'Homme)
 2016. Peuples persécutés d'Orient (Édition du Rocher) 
 2020. A la Serbie - ouvrage collectif dirigé par Luc Luret (Edition un infini cercle bleu)

Arno Gouillon is the editor of the NGO's magazine which is published in France every three months in 13,000 copies. Following the publication of an article 10 pages long in the prominent Figaro Magazine, in June 2019, he received, along with the deputy director of Le Figaro, threats and insults from Albanians and pro-Albanian French journalists.

Private life 
Arnaud Gouillon is married to Ivana Gajić. His wife is of Serbian origin, born in France, with whom he has three children, daughters Milena (2015) and Irena (2017) and son Viktor (2021). They met by chance in Zvornik, where Arnaud was working as an engineer while Ivana was visiting her relatives. Ivana has a degree in political science from the University of Paris and worked as a political assistant at the National Assembly in Paris, then in Brussels and Strasbourg, as well as at the Court in Chambéry. She now works at the humanitarian organization Solidarity for Kosovo, where she is in charge of relations with donors, French officials and the media. 
Arnaud Gouillon has been practicing kickboxing, roller skating and skiing since his early youth.

Acknowledgments and decorations

Decorations 

 2016. Gold Medal for Outstanding Merits in the Field of Humanitarian Work, granted by the President of the Republic of Serbia Tomislav Nikolić
 2018. Decoration of Saint Bishop Nikolai, highest decoration of the Eparchy of Šabac "for his great love for the Serbian people in Kosovo and Metohija and for his humanitarian work"
 2018. Decoration of Saint Sava of the First Degree from the Patriarch of the Serbian Orthodox Church Irinej "for the effective love shown by his wholehearted and selfless efforts in gathering and providing the necessary material and financial assistance for our Holy Church and the suffering people in Kosovo and Metohija, as well as for the continuous witnessing of the truth about the life of our people in this Serbian province."

Other awards 
 2012. Special award plaque for the noblest achievement of the year, awarded by Novosti
 2015. Citizenship of the Republic of Serbia based on his merits, in the Palace of Serbia from the Minister of the Interior, Nebojša Stefanović
 2017. "Branislav Mane Šakić" Award for preserving the Serbian language and cultivating the culture of speech in the electronic media.
 2018. Charter of the Knight of Saint Sava Pacifism of the Ministry of Foreign Affairs of the Republic of Serbia for humanitarian work in Kosovo and Metohija, as well as for the commitment in France to change the image of Serbia.
 2022. "Cyrillic Grant" Award of the Cyrillic Heritage event in Bajina Bašta, for great contribution to the preservation of the Serbian national alphabet, opening of Serbian language schools abroad, assistance to schools in Kosovo and Metohija and participation in The Caravan of the Culture of Speech.

References

Literature 

 
Interview for the Serbian daily Večernje Novosti
Documentary for the Serbian National Television RTS - "Trag"
Interview for TV Most
Arnaud Gouillon is awarded with the Serbian citizenship - Serbian National Television RTS
Interview for the Serbian daily Večernje Novosti
Interview for the Serbian daily Politika

External links 

 Official biography of Arnaud Gouillon on the website of the Office for cooperation with thediaspora and Serbs in the region
 Solidarité Kosovo – Official presentation

1985 births
Living people
French humanitarians
Serbian humanitarians
Recipients of the Order of St. Sava
20th-century French people
21st-century French people